Sodium amide, commonly called sodamide (systematic name sodium azanide), is the inorganic compound with the formula . It is a salt composed of the sodium cation and the azanide anion. This solid, which is dangerously reactive toward water, is white, but commercial samples are typically gray due to the presence of small quantities of metallic iron from the manufacturing process. Such impurities do not usually affect the utility of the reagent.  conducts electricity in the fused state, its conductance being similar to that of NaOH in a similar state.  has been widely employed as a strong base in organic synthesis.

Preparation and structure
Sodium amide can be prepared by the reaction of sodium with ammonia gas, but it is usually prepared by the reaction in liquid ammonia using iron(III) nitrate as a catalyst. The reaction is fastest at the boiling point of the ammonia, c. −33 °C. An electride, is formed as a reaction intermediate.

 is a salt-like material and as such, crystallizes as an infinite polymer. The geometry about sodium is tetrahedral.

Uses
Sodium amide is mainly used as a strong base in organic chemistry, often in liquid ammonia solution. It is the reagent of choice for the drying of ammonia (liquid or gaseous). One of the main advantages to the use of sodium amide is that it mainly functions as a nucleophile. In the industrial production of indigo, sodium amide is a component of the highly basic mixture that induces cyclisation of N-phenylglycine. The reaction produces ammonia, which is recycled typically.

Dehydrohalogenation
Sodium amide induces the loss of two equivalents of hydrogen bromide from a vicinal dibromoalkane to give a carbon–carbon triple bond, as in a preparation of phenylacetylene.
Usually two equivalents of sodium amide yields the desired alkyne. Three equivalents are necessary in the preparation of a terminal alkynes because the terminal CH of the resulting alkyne protonates an equivalent amount of base.

Hydrogen chloride and ethanol can also be eliminated in this way, as in the preparation of 1-ethoxy-1-butyne.

Cyclization reactions
Where there is no β-hydrogen to be eliminated, cyclic compounds may be formed, as in the preparation of methylenecyclopropane below.

Cyclopropenes, aziridines
and cyclobutanes may be formed in a similar manner.

Deprotonation of carbon and nitrogen acids
Carbon acids which can be deprotonated by sodium amide in liquid ammonia include terminal alkynes,
methyl ketones,
cyclohexanone, phenylacetic acid and its derivatives
and diphenylmethane. Acetylacetone loses two protons to form a dianion. Sodium amide will also deprotonate indole and piperidine.

Related non-nucleophilic bases
It is however poorly soluble in solvents other than ammonia. Its use has been superseded by the related reagents sodium hydride, sodium bis(trimethylsilyl)amide (NaHMDS), and lithium diisopropylamide (LDA).

Other reactions
Rearrangement with orthodeprotonation
Oxirane synthesis
Indole synthesis
Chichibabin reaction

Safety
Sodium amide decomposes violently on contact with water, producing ammonia and sodium hydroxide:

When burned in oxygen, it will give oxides of sodium (which react with the produced water, giving sodium hydroxide) along with nitrogen oxides:

In the presence of limited quantities of air and moisture, such as in a poorly closed container, explosive mixtures of peroxides may form. This is accompanied by a yellowing or browning of the solid. As such, sodium amide is to be stored in a tightly closed container, under an atmosphere of an inert gas. Sodium amide samples which are yellow or brown in color represent explosion risks.

References

Metal amides
Reagents for organic chemistry
Sodium compounds